The California–UCLA football rivalry is an American college football rivalry between the California Golden Bears football team of the University of California, Berkeley and UCLA Bruins football team of the University of California, Los Angeles.

History
Traditionally, the Cal–UCLA rivalry is played on "All-University Weekend". During the same week, UCLA and Cal usually play each other in the other sports in season, and the schools would host festivals celebrating the achievements of the UC System. Played annually since 1933, it was the third-longest never-interrupted rivalry in college football, behind only Iowa State vs. Kansas State (uninterrupted since 1917), and Navy vs. Notre Dame (uninterrupted since 1927). Because Navy and Notre Dame did not play in 2020 due to the Covid pandemic, it is now the second-longest never-interrupted rivalry in college football. Because so many college football rivalries were interrupted by the 2020 Covid pandemic, Iowa State/Kansas State and UCLA/Cal are now the only two never-interrupted rivalries that still exist in the Football Bowl Subdivision (FBS) of NCAA Division I college football. Due to the two teams nicknames being named after bears, it is sometimes referred to as the Bear Bowl by some fans.

In 2020, the rivalry was set to end its yearly streak due to the pandemic-shortened 2020 season. However, after unexpected cancellations for both Cal and UCLA, on November 13, 2020 the Pac-12 scheduled the game for November 15, 2020. This also meant that Cal would presumably not host UCLA in Berkeley until 2022, as Cal was forced to travel to the Rose Bowl for the 2nd straight year. The game alternates between the two respective schools. (Excepting 2020) contests in odd-numbered years are played in Pasadena, and even-numbered years in Berkeley. The rivalry will likely be interrupted once UCLA and USC join the Big Ten Conference in 2024.

Game results

See also  
 List of NCAA college football rivalry games
 Stanford–USC football rivalry

References

College football rivalries in the United States
California Golden Bears football
UCLA Bruins football
1933 establishments in California